Scanlan's Monthly was a monthly publication which ran from March 1970 to January 1971. The publisher was Scanlan's Literary House. Edited by Warren Hinckle III and Sidney Zion, it featured politically controversial muckraking and was ultimately subject to an investigation by the FBI during the Nixon administration. It was boycotted by printers as "un-American" by 1971. According to the publishers, more than 50 printers refused to handle the January 1971 special issue Guerilla War in the USA because it appeared to be promoting domestic terrorism. The issue was finally printed in Quebec and in a German translation in Stuttgart (Guerilla-Krieg in USA, Deutsche Verlagsanstalt 1971). The magazine produced a total of eight issues during its existence.

Scanlan's is best-remembered for featuring several articles by Hunter S. Thompson, and especially for what is considered the first instance of gonzo journalism, Thompson's "The Kentucky Derby Is Decadent and Depraved". Thompson's articles from this period are collected with others in The Great Shark Hunt.

In the magazine, its name was described as being that of a "universally despised Irish pig farmer".

The September 1970 issue included an editorial entitled, "Nixon And The Bums", with an accompanying picture of President Nixon having lunch with a group of construction union leaders who attended the so-called White House Hard Hat Luncheon. The editorial identified each of the individuals and enumerated each one's alleged criminal record. To advertise the issue, Scanlan's ran two full-page ads in the New York Times which were noticed by the White House. This was the primary reason for the enmity that ensued in Washington.

It is also remembered for its catchy subscription-ad slogan adapted from Finley Peter Dunne's Mr. Dooley, "You Trust Your Mother But You Cut the Cards."

References

External links
 A map from the Guerrilla War in the U.S.A., January 1971 Issue
 Excerpts from Scanlans Guerrilla War in the U.S.A. January 1971 Issue
 Scanlans Guerrilla War in the U.S.A. January 1971 Issue
Monthly magazines published in the United States
Defunct political magazines published in the United States
Magazines established in 1970
Magazines disestablished in 1971
Magazines published in Quebec